Donald Hugh Henley (born July 22, 1947) is an American musician, and a founding member of the rock band Eagles, for whom he is the drummer and one of the lead vocalists. Henley sang the lead vocals on Eagles hits such as "Witchy Woman", "Desperado", "Best of My Love", "One of These Nights", "Hotel California", "Life in the Fast Lane", "The Last Resort", "The Long Run" and "Get Over It".

After the Eagles disbanded in 1980, Henley pursued a solo career and released his debut studio album I Can't Stand Still, in 1982. He has released five studio albums, two compilation albums, and one live DVD. His solo hits include "Dirty Laundry", "The Boys of Summer", "All She Wants to Do Is Dance", "Sunset Grill", "Not Enough Love in the World", "The End of the Innocence", "The Last Worthless Evening" and "The Heart of the Matter".

The Eagles have sold over 150 million albums worldwide, won six Grammy Awards, had five number one singles, 17 top 40 singles, and six number one albums. They were inducted into the Rock and Roll Hall of Fame in 1998 and are the highest selling American band in history. As a solo artist, Henley has sold over 10 million albums worldwide, had eight top 40 singles, won two Grammy Awards and five MTV Video Music Awards. Combined with the Eagles and as a solo artist, Henley has released 25 top 40 singles on the Billboard Hot 100. He has also released seven studio albums with the Eagles and five as a solo artist. In 2008, he was ranked as the 87th greatest singer of all time by Rolling Stone magazine.

Henley has also played a founding role in several environmental and political causes, most notably the Walden Woods Project. From 1994 to 2016, he divided his musical activities between the Eagles and his solo career.

Early life
Donald Hugh Henley was born July 22, 1947, in Gilmer, Texas, and grew up in the small northeast Texas town of Linden. He is the son of Hughlene (née McWhorter; 1916–2003) and C. J. Henley (1907–1972). He has Irish, English and Scottish ancestry. Henley attended Linden-Kildare High School, where he initially played football, but due to his relatively small build his coach suggested that he quit, and he joined the high school band instead. He first played the trombone, then in the percussion section. 

After graduating from high school in 1965, he initially attended college at Stephen F. Austin State University in Nacogdoches, Texas. He then attended North Texas State University (renamed in 1988 the University of North Texas) in Denton, Texas, from 1967 to 1969. Henley left school to spend time with his father, who was dying of heart and arterial disease.

Career beginnings
While still at high school, Henley was asked to join a Dixieland band formed by his childhood friend Richard Bowden's father Elmer, together with another school friend Jerry Surratt. They then formed a band called the Four Speeds. In 1964 the band was renamed Felicity, then finally Shiloh, and went through a number of changes in band personnel. As Felicity they were signed to a local producer and released a Henley-penned song called "Hurtin'". In 1969, they met by chance fellow Texan Kenny Rogers who took an interest in their band. They changed their name to Shiloh and recorded a few songs for Rogers, and "Jennifer (O' My Lady)" was released as their first single. Surratt, however, died in a dirt bike accident just before their single was released, and the band members then became Henley, Richard Bowden and his cousin Michael Bowden, Al Perkins, and Jim Ed Norman. Rogers helped sign the band to Amos Records, and brought the band to Los Angeles in June 1970. They recorded a self-titled album produced by Rogers at Larrabee Studios while living at the home of Rogers for a few months. Shiloh disbanded in 1971 over the band's leadership and creative differences between Henley and Bowden.

In Los Angeles, Henley met Glenn Frey as they were both signed to the same label (Frey was signed to Amos Records, together with J. D. Souther, as the duo Longbranch Pennywhistle), and they were recruited by John Boylan to be members of Linda Ronstadt's backup band for her tour in 1971. Touring with her was the catalyst for forming a group, as Henley and Frey decided to form their own band. They were joined by Randy Meisner and Bernie Leadon who also played in Ronstadt's backing band (the four had, however, played together only once previously, as the band personnel changed) and became the Eagles.

Eagles

Eagles were formed in 1971, and signed to David Geffen's label Asylum Records. They released their first studio album in 1972, which contained the hit song "Take It Easy", co-written by Jackson Browne. During the band's run, Henley co-wrote (usually with Frey) most of the band's best-known songs. "Witchy Woman", which was co-written with Leadon, was his first commercially successful song, while "Desperado" marks the beginning of his songwriting partnership with Frey.

Henley sang lead vocals on many of the band's popular songs, including "Desperado", "Witchy Woman", "Best of My Love", "One of These Nights", "Hotel California", "The Long Run", "Life in the Fast Lane" and "Wasted Time". Eagles won numerous Grammy Awards during the 1970s and became one of the world's most successful rock bands of all time.  They are also among the top five overall best-selling bands of all time in America, and the highest-selling American band in U.S. history. Henley and Frey have been called the American version of McCartney and Lennon.

The band broke up in 1980, following a difficult tour and personal tensions that arose during the recording of The Long Run. Eagles reunited 14 years later in 1994. Henley continues to tour and record with the Eagles. Their most recent album, Long Road Out of Eden, was released in 2007. The band had a number of highly successful tours, such as the Hell Freezes Over Tour (1994–1996), and Long Road Out of Eden Tour. On April 1, 2013, during a concert at the Casino Rama in Rama, Ontario, Henley announced the History of the Eagles Tour, which began in July 2013 and ended in July 2015, six months before Frey's death. At the 2016 Grammy Awards, the Eagles and Jackson Browne performed "Take It Easy" as a tribute to Frey.

On his songwriting in the band, Henley stated in a March 2001 interview on Charlie Rose that "rock bands work best as a benevolent dictatorship", with the principal songwriters in a band (in the case of Eagles, "me and Glenn Frey") being the ones that will likely hold the power.

Solo career
Following the breakup of the Eagles, Henley embarked on a solo career. He and Stevie Nicks (his girlfriend at the time) had duetted on her Top 10 Pop and Adult Contemporary hit "Leather and Lace", written by Nicks for Waylon Jennings and his wife Jessi Colter, in late 1981. Henley's first solo album, I Can't Stand Still, was a moderate seller. The single "Dirty Laundry" reached No. 3 on the Billboard Hot 100 at the beginning of 1983 and earned a Gold-certified single for sales of over a million copies in the US. It was Henley's all-time biggest solo hit single, and also was nominated for a Grammy Award. Henley also contributed "Love Rules" to the 1982 Fast Times at Ridgemont High movie soundtrack.

This was followed in 1984 by the album, Building the Perfect Beast. A single release, "The Boys of Summer", reached No. 5 on the Billboard Hot 100. The music video for the song was directed by Jean-Baptiste Mondino and won several MTV Video Music Awards including Best Video of the Year. Henley also won the Grammy Award for Best Male Rock Vocal Performance for the song. Several other songs on the album, "All She Wants to Do Is Dance" (No. 9 on Hot 100), "Not Enough Love in the World" (No. 34) and "Sunset Grill" (No. 22) also received considerable airplay. He then had a No. 3 album rock chart hit with "Who Owns This Place?" from 1986's The Color of Money soundtrack.

Henley's next album, 1989's The End of the Innocence, was even more successful. The album's title track, a collaboration with Bruce Hornsby, reached No. 8 as a single. "The Heart of the Matter", "The Last Worthless Evening" and "New York Minute" were among other songs that gained radio airplay. Henley again won the Best Male Rock Vocal Performance Grammy Award in 1990 for "The End of the Innocence". Also in 1990, Henley made a brief appearance on MTV's Unplugged series.

In 1995, Henley released the single "The Garden of Allah" to promote his greatest hits solo album Actual Miles: Henley's Greatest Hits.

MusicRadar called Henley one of the greatest singing drummers of all time.

In live shows, Henley plays drums and sings simultaneously on some Eagles songs. On his solo songs and other Eagles songs, he plays electric guitar and simultaneously sings or just sings solo. Occasionally Eagles songs would get drastic rearrangements, such as "Hotel California" with four trombones.

Lawsuits with Geffen Records
Henley spent many years in legal entanglements with Geffen Records. In January 1993, following prolonged tensions between Henley and the label, the dispute went public and the record company filed a $30 million breach-of-contract suit in California Superior Court after receiving a notice from Henley saying that he was terminating his contract even though he reportedly owed the company two more studio albums and a greatest-hits collection. Henley wanted to sign a publishing deal with EMI that would have been worth a few million dollars. Geffen Records stopped this from happening, which in turn upset Henley.

Geffen Records claimed that Henley was in breach of contract and Henley attempted to get out of his contract in 1993 based on a 50-year-old California statute. Under the statute, enacted to free actors from long-term studio deals, entertainers cannot be forced to work for any company for more than seven years. Geffen Records did not want Henley signing with any other label, and had an agreement with Sony and EMI that they would not sign Henley. He counter-sued Geffen Records, claiming that he was "blackballed" by David Geffen, who had made agreements with other record labels to not sign him. Henley eventually became an outspoken advocate for musicians' rights, taking a stand against music labels who he believes refuse to pay bands their due royalties. Henley came to terms with Geffen Records when the Eagles' reunion took off and the company eventually took a large chunk of the profit from the reunion album. Glenn Frey was also in legal entanglements with his label, MCA Records (whose parent company had also acquired Geffen). Before the Eagles reunion tour could begin, the band had to file a suit against Elektra Records, which had planned to release a new Eagles Greatest Hits album. The band won that battle.

A long period without a new recording followed as Henley waited out a dispute with his record company while also participating in a 1994 Eagles reunion tour and live album. During the hiatus, Henley recorded a cover of "Sit Down, You're Rockin' the Boat" for the film Leap of Faith, and provided the background vocals for country star Trisha Yearwood's hit single "Walkaway Joe", and duetted with Patty Smyth on "Sometimes Love Just Ain't Enough", and Roger Waters on "Watching TV" on Waters' Amused to Death album, in 1992. Henley provided the voice of Henry Faust in Randy Newman's Faust, a 1993 musical which was released on compact disc that year.

Henley and Courtney Love testified at a California Senate hearing on that state's contractual laws in Sacramento on September 5, 2001. In 2002 Henley became the head of the Recording Artists' Coalition. The coalition's primary aim was to raise money to mount a legal and political battle against the major record labels. Henley says the group seeks to change the fundamental rules that govern most recording contracts, including copyright ownership, long-term control of intellectual property and unfair accounting practices. This group filed a friend-of-the-court brief in the Napster case, urging District Judge Marilyn Hall Patel not to accept the industry's broad claims of works made for hire authorship.

Inside Job and recent solo work

In 2000, after 11 years, Henley released another solo album titled Inside Job which peaked at number 7 on the Billboard 200 and contained the new singles "Taking You Home", "Everything Is Different Now", "Workin' It" and "For My Wedding". He performed songs from the album in a VH1 Storytellers episode during 2000. In 2002 a live DVD entitled Don Henley: Live Inside Job was released. In 2005, Henley opened 10 of Stevie Nicks' concerts on her Two Voices Tour.

Henley performed duets with Kenny Rogers on Rogers' 2006 release Water & Bridges, titled "Calling Me" and on Reba McEntire's 2007 album, Reba: Duets, performing "Break Each Other's Hearts Again".

In a 2007 interview with CNN, while discussing the future of the Eagles, Henley indicated he still has plans for more records: "But we all have some solo plans still. I still have a contract with a major label [Warner] for a couple of solo albums." In January 2011, Henley commenced work on a solo album of country covers featuring special guests. Ronnie Dunn from Brooks & Dunn and Alison Krauss have recorded a song with Henley for the album.

On July 18, 2015, Henley started pre-orders of his album, Cass County. The album was released on September 25.

Henley was honored with the "Lifetime Achievement" award during the East Texas Music Awards event in 2015.

Political and other causes
In 1990, Henley founded the Walden Woods Project to help protect "Walden Woods" from development. The Thoreau Institute at Walden Woods was started in 1998 to provide for research and education regarding Henry David Thoreau. In 1993, a compilation album titled Common Thread: The Songs of the Eagles was released, with a portion of the royalties from the sales going to the Walden Woods Project. In 2005, he had a fundraiser concert with Elton John and others to buy Brister's Hill, part of Walden Woods, and turn it into a hiking trail.

Henley co-founded the non-profit Caddo Lake Institute in 1993 with Dwight K. Shellman to underwrite ecological education and research. As part of the Caddo Lake Coalition, CLI helps protect the Texas wetland where Henley spent much of his childhood. As a result of the Caddo Lake Institute's success in restoring and protecting Caddo Lake's wetlands, Caddo Lake was included as the 13th site in the United States on the Ramsar Convention's list of significant wetlands. The Ramsar Convention is an intergovernmental treaty that provides a framework for national action and international cooperation for the conservation and wise use of wetlands and their resources.

In 2000, Henley co-founded the Recording Artists' Coalition, a group founded to protect musicians' rights against common music industry business practices. In this role he testified before the U.S. Senate Committee on the Judiciary in 2001 and the U.S. Senate Committee on Commerce, Science and Transportation in 2003.

Henley in a 2008 interview revealed that he contributes to many other charitable causes such as The Race to Erase MS, and the Rhythm and Blues Foundation. He is also a member of the CuriosityStream Advisory Board.

A lifelong supporter of the Democratic Party, Henley has also been a generous donor to political campaigns of Democrats. In 2008, The Washington Post reported Henley had donated over $680,000 to political candidates since 1978. Several tracks on the 2007 Eagles album Long Road Out of Eden (including the title track, which Henley co-wrote) are sharply critical of the Iraq War and other policies of the Bush administration.

Henley's liberal political leanings led to tension with guitarist Bernie Leadon when he submitted the song "I Wish You Peace" for inclusion on One of These Nights. Henley was not thrilled that the song was co-written by Patti Davis, who was the daughter of Ronald Reagan, the Republican governor of California at that time.

Henley endorsed Joe Biden in the 2020 presidential election.

In a fundraiser hosted by Matthew McConaughey to raise money for Texans affected by the snowstorms in February 2021, Henley performed "Snow", which was written by Jesse Winchester. The show premiered on March 21, 2021. Henley remarked "On that bitter cold Tuesday of February 16th, we had a busted pipe at the attic at my house, and me and my family were shoveling and bailing for 8 or 9 hours there. Nothing, of course, compared to the shoveling and bailing that's been going on down in the state capitol the past 3 weeks."

In a Discover Concord magazine in the summer of 2021, Henley spoke of the Walden Woods Foundation as well as his life during the COVID-19 pandemic. Henley noted that "I think that each and every one of us has a duty to help care for our natural environment, even if it's something as simple as not throwing your fast-food wrapper out the car window."

Personal life
In 1974, Henley became involved with Loree Rodkin, and the breakup of their relationship was the inspiration for the song "Wasted Time" and parts of the lyrics for "Hotel California". Late in 1975, Henley started dating Fleetwood Mac singer Stevie Nicks as her relationship with Lindsey Buckingham came to an end. The relationship lasted on and off for around two years. Nicks later wrote a song "Sara" that Henley claimed was about their unborn child, for which Nicks had an abortion. Henley then began a three-year-long relationship with actress/model and Bond girl Lois Chiles.

Henley called paramedics to his home on November 21, 1980, where a 16-year-old girl was found naked and claiming she had overdosed on quaaludes and cocaine. She was arrested for prostitution, while a 15-year-old girl found in the house was arrested for being under the influence of drugs. Henley was arrested and subsequently charged with contributing to the delinquency of a minor. He pled no contest, was fined $2,500 and put on two years' probation. Chiles, who was no longer in a relationship with Henley at the time of the incident, later said, "I was shocked to hear about it. He didn't have drugs around the house. It was an accident, I'm sure". The media attention from this incident was primary among the inspirations for the solo hit, "Dirty Laundry".

In the early 1980s, Henley was engaged to Battlestar Galactica actress Maren Jensen. His first solo album I Can't Stand Still was dedicated to Jensen, who also sang harmony vocals on the song "Johnny Can't Read". He and Jensen separated in 1986.

In 1995, Henley married model and socialite Sharon Summerall. Performers at the wedding included Bruce Springsteen, Sting, Billy Joel, John Fogerty, Jackson Browne, Sheryl Crow, Glenn Frey, and Tony Bennett. Henley later wrote the song "Everything Is Different Now" from the album Inside Job for Sharon. Summerall has been diagnosed with multiple sclerosis. They have three children together, two girls and a boy.

In 2012, Henley was estimated to be the fourth-wealthiest drummer in the world, behind Ringo Starr, Phil Collins and Dave Grohl, with a $200 million fortune.

Discography

Studio albums
I Can't Stand Still (1982)
Building the Perfect Beast (1984)
The End of the Innocence (1989)
Inside Job (2000)
Cass County (2015)

Awards and nominations
Henley has won two Grammys and a further award associated with the Grammys, MusiCares Person of the Year. He has also won a number of other awards, such as MTV Music Video Awards for "The Boys Of Summer" in 1985, and "The End of the Innocence" in 1990.

In May 2012, Henley was awarded an honorary Doctorate of Music from Berklee College of Music along with Timothy B. Schmit, Joe Walsh and Glenn Frey.

In 2015, Henley received the Trailblazer Award from the Americana Music Honors & Awards.

Grammys

!
|-
!scope="row"|1983
|"Dirty Laundry"
|Rock Male Vocalist
|
| style="text-align:center;"|
|-
!scope="row" rowspan="4"|1986
|rowspan="3" |"The Boys of Summer"
|Rock Male Vocalist
|
|rowspan="4" style="text-align:center;"|
|-
|Record of the Year
|
|-
|Song of the Year
|
|-
|Don Henley, Danny Kortchmar, Greg Ladanyi
|Producer of the Year
|
|-
!scope="row" rowspan="4"|1990
|scope="row" rowspan="3"|"The End of the Innocence"
|Rock Male Vocalist
|
|rowspan="4" style="text-align:center;"|
|-
|Record of the Year
|
|-
|Song of the Year
|
|-
|The End of the Innocence
|Album of the Year
|
|-
!scope="row" |1993
|"Sometimes Love Just Ain't Enough", Patty Smyth & Don Henley
|Pop Performance by a Duo
|
|style="text-align:center;"|
|-
!scope="row" rowspan="3"|2001
|"Taking You Home"
|Male Pop Vocal Performance
|
|rowspan="3" style="text-align:center;"|
|-
|"Workin' It"
|Rock Male Vocalist
|
|-
|Inside Job
|Pop Vocal Album
|
|-
!scope="row|2002
|"Inside Out", Trisha Yearwood & Don Henley
|Country Collaboration with Vocals
|
|style="text-align:center;"|
|-
!scope="row|2003
|"It's So Easy", Sheryl Crow & Don Henley
|Pop Collaboration with Vocals
|
|style="text-align:center;"|
|-
!rowspan="2" scope="row" |2007
|Don Henley
|MusiCares Person of the Year
|
|style="text-align:center;"|
|-
|"Calling Me", Kenny Rogers & Don Henley
|Country Collaboration with Vocals
|
|style="text-align:center;"|
|-
!scope="row"|2016
|"The Cost of Living", Stan Lynch and Don Henley
|American Roots Song
|
|style="text-align:center;"|
|-

References

External links

 
 
 
 
 Walden Woods Project website
 Caddo Lake Institute
 Recording Artists' Coalition  website

 
1947 births
20th-century American drummers
20th-century American guitarists
Living people
American country rock singers
American country singer-songwriters
American rock drummers
American male singer-songwriters
American rock singers
American tenors
American country drummers
American session musicians
American rock guitarists
American male drummers
American male guitarists
American people of English descent
American people of Irish descent
American people of Scottish descent
Asylum Records artists
Geffen Records artists
Kennedy Center honorees
American multi-instrumentalists
Tabla players
People from Linden, Texas
Singer-songwriters from Texas
Eagles (band) members
Grammy Award winners
Stephen F. Austin State University alumni
University of North Texas alumni
People from Gilmer, Texas
National Humanities Medal recipients
Texas Democrats
Music of Denton, Texas
Guitarists from Texas
American conservationists